The tenth season of New Zealand reality television series The Block NZ, titled The Block NZ: Redemption, premiered on 18 July 2022. It is set in the Auckland suburb of Orewa.

The judges are Shelly Ferguson and Jason Bonham. The host is Mark Richardson and the site foreman is Peter Wolfkamp.

Contestants 
This season saw the return of four former teams from past seasons of The Block NZ.

Score history

Room reveal scores

 Colour key:
  Highest Score
  Lowest Score

Team judging scores

Teams did not judge each other's:

 Guest bedrooms.
 Sitting Rooms/Study's
 Living Room
 Garage and Laundry
 Redemption Week
 Best House Week
 Colourkey:
  Highest Score
  Lowest Score

Challenge results

Auction results

References 

2022 New Zealand television seasons